The 2024 United States presidential election in Maine is scheduled to take place on Tuesday, November 5, 2024, as part of the 2024 United States elections in which all 50 states plus the District of Columbia will participate. Maine voters will choose electors to represent them in the Electoral College via a popular vote. The state of Maine has four electoral votes in the Electoral College, following reapportionment due to the 2020 United States census in which the state neither gained nor lost a seat. Unlike all other states except Nebraska, Maine awards two electoral votes based on the statewide vote, and one vote for each congressional district.

Incumbent Democratic president Joe Biden has stated that he intends to run for reelection to a second term.

Primary elections

Republican primary

The Maine Republican caucuses are scheduled to be held on Super Tuesday, March 5, 2024.

General election

Polling
Joe Biden vs. Donald Trump

See also 
 United States presidential elections in Maine
 2024 United States presidential election
 2024 Democratic Party presidential primaries
 2024 Republican Party presidential primaries
 2024 United States elections

Notes

References 

Maine
2024
Presidential